Show No Mercy is a 1983 album by Slayer, or the title song.

Show No Mercy may also refer to:
 No quarter, the military command to not spare any enemy
Show No Mercy, a 2008 novel by Cindy Gerard 
 Show No Mercy (Bride album), 1986, or the title song
 "Show No Mercy" (song), a 1990 song by Mark Williams
 "Show No Mercy", a song by W.A.S.P. from the album W.A.S.P.

See also 
 Show Them No Mercy!, 1935 American crime film
 No Mercy (disambiguation)